Scottsville is an unincorporated community in Amador County, California. It was settled in the mid-1800s as a mining town.

References

Unincorporated communities in California
Unincorporated communities in Amador County, California